Farai Simoyi (born 1983) is a British–Zimbabwean fashion designer, television personality, educator, and entrepreneur. She appeared on the first edition of the fashion design competition series Next in Fashion in 2020.

Early life
Farai Simoyi was born on 1 October 1983 in London, England. She lived her early childhood in Harare, Zimbabwe, where she attended early primary education at Groombridge Primary School before moving to West Virginia in the United States of America. She completed her primary and secondary education in the USA before proceeding to West Virginia University. She attained her Fashion Design & Merchandising degree at West Virginia University and studied design at Nuova Accademia di Belle Arti in Millan, Italy.

Career
Farai Simoyi began her career in fashion design in 2005. Over the years she rose to prominence through designing and consulting for celebrity brands, which include Beyonce, Jay-Z, Nicki Minaj, Justin Timberlake, Rachel Roy, Anne Klein, and Robert Rodriguez.

In 2010 she debuted her brand Farai Inc at New York Fashion Week 2010, where she was identified as a ‘Breakout Designer’ by Time Out New York, She then went on to establish The Narativ House in 2017 which houses ethically-sourced artisan brands from around the world with an emphasis on sustainability and traditional craftsmanship through human-centered design.

Television
In 2007, Simoyi had her television debut on TLC’s design competition series I’ve got nothing to wear. In the series, design contestants were paired up with a client that had an entire closet of clothes yet still complained, “I’ve got nothing to wear”. The designers would invade the closets of their clients and pull garments with plans to upcycle them into new, revived garments.
 
Simoyi's second television appearance was in 2020 when she appeared on the first season of the Netflix fashion design competition series Next in Fashion in 2020. She was the only African on the show which featured eighteen international designers. On the show, Simoyi was partnered with an American fashion designer, Kianga "Kiki" Milele. The two designers worked with each other at The Nicki Minaj Collection. The designers appeared in 5 episodes and exited after the 5th episode.

Academia
In 2020, Simoyi became the Program Director & Professor of B.S. Fashion Design and M.S. International Fashion Design Management for the Kanbar School of Engineering & Design at Thomas Jefferson University. Simoyi launched one of the first undergraduate 3D Virtual Fashion Design curriculums in Philadelphia, utilizing software such as CLO3D.

Volunteering
In 2022 Simoyi became a Fashion Scholarship Fund Equity Committee member in partnership with the Virgil Abloh "Post-Modern" Scholarship Fund. The Fashion Scholarship Fund Equity Committee works directly with the country's most talented young students from diverse backgrounds and awards over $1 million each year in scholarships to help students succeed in all industry sectors, including design, merchandising, marketing analytics, and business strategy. Simoyi is also an advisory board member for the Council for International African Fashion Education (CIAFE) representing North America and board member for the Philadelphia Fashion & Garment Industry Task Force (PFGITF).

Awards and recognition
The Next Best Designer – Essence list of 2020
Female Entrepreneur of the year – Zimbabwe Achievers Awards USA 2018
GC4W 20 Most Influential African Women Entrepreneurs & Leaders in America 2016
GC4W Top 100 Women in the World
Influential African Women To Watch  – Ladybrille Magazine 2016
Designer of the year – African Entertainment Awards USA
Emerging Designer of the Year – African Diaspora Awards 2012

Notable positions
Senior Designer – Nicki Minaj Collection 2013–2016
Head Denim & Woven's Designer – Beyonce, House of Deréon 2007 – 2010
Curator at NYNow Fashion Runway 2019
Fashion Contributor – Start by WGSN 2020

External links

References

Living people
Fashion designers
Netflix people
American people of Zimbabwean descent
Shona people
1983 births
West Virginia University alumni